Catherine Delcroix (born 1955) is a French sociologist whose work employs methods drawn from sociology and biographical tools. Her major sociological works concern poverty, inequality and homelessness. She is a professor of sociology in the French Strasbourg University and a fellow of the “UMR Printemps”, a French research institute specializing in sociological and biographical studies.

Catherine Delcroix is a member of the Executing Committee of the European Sociological Association (or ESA), an association aimed to facilitate sociological research, teaching and communication on European issues, and to build networks between European sociologists. She is also a member of its Qualitative Methods Research Network.

Principal works

 2001, Ombres et lumières de la famille Nour. Comment certains résistent à la précarité ?, Payot, 258 pages (deuxième édition augmentée en poche, Payot Rivages, mars 2005), Paris
 1998, (with Anne Guyaux), Double mixte, le mariage comme lieu de rencontre de deux cultures, L’Harmattan, en coédition avec l’éditeur belge " Contradictions " et l’ADRI, 132 pages, Paris
 1996, (with Chahla Beski) Des médiatrices dans les quartiers fragilisés : le lien, La Documentation Française, 136 pages, Paris
 1996, « L’immigration, histoires et mémoires, la présence des pères », Informations sociales, n° 55, CNAF, Paris
 1986, Espoirs et réalités de la femme arabe : Egypte-Algérie, L’Harmattan, 236 pages, Paris

Notes

External links
Page in the French Wikipedia.
Page of Catherine Delcroix on the Strasbourg University web-site

French sociologists
French women sociologists
1955 births
Living people